West Gervais Street Historic District is a national historic district located at Columbia, South Carolina.  The district encompasses 40 contributing buildings in a commercial, warehouse, and light industrial section of Columbia. They date from about 1846 to the 1930s.  Notable buildings include the W. H. Gibbes Machinery Co. and Carriage Works, Seaboard Air
Line Railroad Passenger Depot, and Seaboard Air Line Railroad Baggage Room.

It was added to the National Register of Historic Places in 1983.

References

Historic districts on the National Register of Historic Places in South Carolina
Buildings and structures in Columbia, South Carolina
National Register of Historic Places in Columbia, South Carolina